The Supreme Court of the Philippines is due to move to a proposed building to be built at the Bonifacio Capital District in Fort Bonifacio, Taguig, Metro Manila.

History
The Supreme Court of the Philippines occupies a buildings on a lot owned by the University of the Philippines Manila. The court has not own its own property in its almost 100 years of existence. As early as August 2014, the Supreme Court has expressed its plans to move to Bonifacio Global City (BGC). In July 2015, the court was reportedly prospecting to buy a lot in the business center through the Department of Budget and Management's funds. At that time the court projects that it would have moved to a newer building by 2019.

A  contract between the supreme court and the Bases Conversion and Development Authority preceded a groundbreaking ceremony which was held in October 2015 on the lot where the new supreme court building complex will stand. It was projected at that time that the design phase will commence in 2016 and the construction phase will last from 2017 to 2019. An  environmentally-sustainable design is what the Supreme Court envisions for the building.

Architecture and design
In August 2014, The court reportedly was eyeing architect,  Felino Palafox Jr. to design the BGC Building The International Conceptual Design Competition was later held which called for local and international firms to make their proposals for the design of the Philippine Supreme Court BGC complex. The Supreme Court stipulated the following terms of the competition: it called for a design for a "culturally iconic building and a legacy for generations to come", the incorporation of the "four pillars of justice", and that the design of the building will exhibit a "green and resilient" design for what it says for an "effective and efficient dispensation of justice".

The team from Philippine firm Mañosa & Company led by Angelo Mañosa, was selected as the winner of the design competition from among 10 finalists. The design contract still to be awarded to the firm due to government procedures. Mañosa's design called for a building complex inspired from the sun motif of the Philippine flag. The firm's proposed design calls for a complex composing of three building clusters surrounding a circular central tower which is meant to host the En Banc Session Hall.

References

Bonifacio Global City
Supreme Court of the Philippines
Government buildings in the Philippines
Proposed buildings and structures in Metro Manila